Alexander McEwan (born May 15, 1970) is a Scottish former footballer.

Career 
McEwan began playing at the youth level with Rangers Amateurs B.C. and in 1986 he signed with Glasgow Rangers. In 1989, he played in the Scottish Premier Division with St Mirren F.C. In 1992, he played in the Scottish Football League First Division with Greenock Morton F.C. in the 1992–93 season. In 1993, he was loaned to play in the Canadian National Soccer League with St. Catharines Roma. He returned for the 1993–94 season where he featured in 18 matches and recorded six goals.

In 1994, he played in the Scottish Football League Third Division with Albion Rovers F.C.

References 

1970 births
Living people
Scottish footballers
St Mirren F.C. players
Greenock Morton F.C. players
St. Catharines Roma Wolves players
Albion Rovers F.C. players
Scottish Football League players
Canadian National Soccer League players
Footballers from Glasgow
Association football midfielders